Belvezet is a former commune in the Lozère department in southern France. On 1 January 2017, it was merged into the new commune Mont Lozère et Goulet.

Geography
The commune is traversed by the river Chassezac.

Population

See also
Communes of the Lozère department

References

Former communes of Lozère